Zaid Kilani (1938 - 9 November 2019) was a Jordanian physician specializing in obstetrics and gynecology and founder and director of Farah Maternity Hospital in Amman, and a member of the Jordanian Senate. He died on November 9, 2019.

Early life and education  
He was born in Nazareth-Palestine, but immigrated to Lebanon with his parents and then to Jordan where he completed his primary education. He obtained his Bachelor of Medicine degree at the University of Göttingen, West Germany, in 1964. He obtained a Diploma in Obstetrics and Gynecology in Ireland in 1975.

In 1977 he obtained a Fellowship of The Royal College of Surgeons of England, London.

Achievements 
Founder and Director of Farah Maternity Hospital, Amman, Jordan.

References 

1938 births
2019 deaths
Jordanian obstetricians
21st-century Jordanian politicians
Jordanian people of Palestinian descent
University of Göttingen alumni
Members of the Senate of Jordan
Fellows of the Royal College of Surgeons